The Villa Belgiojoso Bonaparte, also known as Villa Reale and formerly called Villa Comunale, is a palace in Milan, in Lombardy in northern Italy. It was built between 1790 and 1796 as the residence of Count Ludovico Barbiano di Belgiojoso. The villa is in Neoclassical style, and was designed by Leopoldo Pollack. The main entrance is on via Palestro, facing the Giardini Pubblici of Porta Venezia, the eastern gate of the city.

During the Kingdom of Italy it became the residence of Viceroy Eugene de Beuharnais and his family

In 1920 the villa came under the ownership of the Comune of Milan; in 1921 it became the home of the Galleria d'Arte Moderna.

Beside the villa is the Padiglione d'Arte Contemporanea, an exhibition space for contemporary art, which was built in 1955 on the site of the former stables of the palace, destroyed by wartime bombing.

The gardens of the villa, in English style with an artificial lake, were laid out by Leopoldo Pollack.

References

Neoclassical architecture in Milan
Palaces in Milan
Villas in Lombardy
Royal residences in Italy
Tourist attractions in Milan